The Piute Wash of extreme southeastern Nevada and northeast San Bernardino County California is the south-flowing drainage of the Piute Valley. The wash and valley are located northwest of Needles, California.

The Piute Wash watershed and Piute Valley drain the eastern flank of the north-south Piute Range; the main wash drains portions of the northwest Newberry Mountains. The wash hugs the eastern portion of the Piute Valley, and in the southeast of the valley, the wash skirts the west of the Dead Mountains, then traverses the southwest and south perimeter of the Dead Mountains, then descends steeply toward its outfall into the Colorado River in California adjacent Needles. I-40 also descends steeply in this stretch down to Needles.

The Piute Valley and Wash are north–south trending as are the mountains bordering west and east; the  wash's abrupt traverse east to its outfall is about an  stretch.

South Piute Valley

Southern portions of the wash receive some north flowing drainages from the north of the Sacramento Mountains. Also, west of the western perimeter Piute Range of Piute Valley, the Sacramento Wash (Clark County, Nevada) flows south, with the Fenner Valley in the northwest. The Sacramento Wash then turns east to join the Piute Wash. In the southwest a water divide separates the Ward Valley draining southwestwards into San Bernardino County.

Piute Wash watershed
The Piute drainage is west of the Colorado River and Lake Mohave. A narrow drainage from the Newberry and Dead Mountains drain into the Havasu-Mohave Lakes Watershed.

To the north of the Piute Wash watershed and Searchlight is the north-flowing Eldorado Valley, an endorheic basin that forms a dry lake.

Cal-Nev-Ari, Nevada, is in the northern third of the valley.

References

External links
Watersheds
Piute Wash Watershed, Nevada to California
Las Vegas Wash Watershed

Piute Valley
Washes of Nevada
Washes of California
Tributaries of the Lower Colorado River in California
Rivers of Clark County, Nevada
Watersheds of California